Nicolino Locche (September 2, 1939 – September 7, 2005) was an Argentine boxer from Tunuyán, Mendoza who held the World Junior Welterweight title from 1968 to 1972. Locche is often cited as one of the finest defensive boxers of all time and was inducted into the International Boxing Hall of Fame in 2003.

Boxing career
His family came from the Sicilian village of Montalbano Elicona, located in the metropolitan city of Messina.
Locche was known as "El Intocable" ("The Untouchable") due to his defensive mastery, and became the Lineal and WBA Light Welterweight Champion in Tokyo, Japan on December 12, 1968, after defeating Paul Takeshi Fuji by technical knockout after Fuji refused to start the 10th round out of frustration because of exhaustion and his inability to connect punches on "The Untouchable," according to the Argentine boxing commentators' recount of the bout (Dotora, 2004).

Locche became an idol in Argentina and routinely sold out the Luna Park, Buenos Aires every time he fought at the well known boxing arena. His boxing style made him a legend. He possessed uncanny reflexes, standing in front of his opponents with his hands lowered at his sides, behind his back or even resting on his knees as he slipped, bobbed and weaved to avoid his opponent's punches.

Numerous Argentine sources also cite the fact that Locche's approach towards submitting himself to traditional boxing training and discipline was sometimes lackadaisical. For example, Locche was a known habitual cigarette smoker throughout most if not all of his boxing career and his adherence to the strict dietary requirements of his trade was often quite flexible. It was not unusual to see his seconds crowd around him during the 1 minute break between rounds where he would be puffing furiously on a cigarette.

Locche defended his title six times, against Carlos Hernandez, João Henrique, Adolph Pruitt, Antonio Cervantes and Domingo Barrera Corpas, before losing it to Alfonso Frazier in Panama on March 10, 1972. Locche failed to regain the World Champion belt in a rematch with Cervantes (a.k.a., Kid Pambelé) and retired in 1975.

He was champion of Mendoza, Argentina, and South American lightweight and Jr. welterweight. Locche turned professional at the age of 19 and amassed a record of 117-4-14 (14 draws). He was inducted to the International Boxing Hall of Fame in 2003. The Ring has retroactively certified him as lineal Junior Welterweight champion from 1968 to 1972.

Locche died in Las Heras in 2005 of heart failure.

Professional boxing record

See also
List of light welterweight boxing champions
List of WBA world champions

References

External links

ibhof.com
Nicolino Locche - CBZ Profile
 ESPNDEPORTES_Argentina
 Articles from Argentina: Diario Clarin_1
 Diario Clarin_2
 Article from Uruguay El Observador

1939 births
2005 deaths
Argentine people of Italian descent
Argentine people of Sardinian descent
International Boxing Hall of Fame inductees
Light-welterweight boxers
Sportspeople from Mendoza Province
World boxing champions
Argentine male boxers